The Jamaican Exchange is the 127th novel in the long-running Nick Carter-Killmaster series.

Publishing history
The book was first published in 1979.

Main characters
Nick Carter agent N-3, AXE
Hawk Carter’s boss, head of AXE
Miranda dancer at the El Baco Club
Jorges go between for the drug runners
Dave Kramer journalist
Jason Malverne tour operator
Josina  tour guide

Nick Carter-Killmaster novels
1979 American novels
Novels set in Jamaica
Ace Books books